Danebank, officially Danebank An Anglican School for Girls, is an independent Anglican early learning, primary and secondary day school for girls, located in Hurstville, a southern suburb of Sydney, New South Wales, Australia. It is a member school of the Anglican Schools Corporation.

Established in 1933 by Edith Roseby Ball, Danebank has a non-selective enrolment policy and currently caters for approximately 930 students from PreK to Year 12.

The school is affiliated with the Independent Primary School Heads of Australia (IPSHA), the Junior School Heads Association of Australia (JSHAA), the Alliance of Girls' Schools Australasia (AGSA), and the Association of Heads of Independent Girls' Schools (AHIGS).

History
Danebank was established in 1933 on its current site in Hurstville, by Edith Roseby Ball. The school was established as a small co-educational Kindergarten with just five students.

On the 29th October 2018 the current Principal, Mrs Maryanne Davis, co-signed an open letter to the Australian Members of Parliament supporting the rights of faith-based schools to discriminate against staff who do not share the religious beliefs of faith-based schools.

Principals
current principal -

Facilities
Note: Construction and demolition is currently ongoing in Danebank and new facilities will be constructed. The Langdon Wing is being partly demolished for newer facilities.
Danebank's current facilities include:

 The first stage of the Danebank masterplan for redevelopment was officially opened in May 2018. It houses a Pre-Kindergarten Centre and classrooms for Kindergarten to Year 2 students, as well as specialist music, technology and extension class rooms for Junior School.
 The Pre-Kindergarten Centre is part of the new Junior School Building. It has a large classroom, break-out areas where equipment serves different learning needs, outdoor play areas, Little-one's toilet area and staff facilities.
The Gymnasium: opened in 2006. Holds a gymnastics area, court, upstairs dance studio, classroom, staffroom, storerooms, changerooms and contains equipment for sporting activities.
The Terraces: contains equipment and facilities for Design and Technology, Visual Arts, Hospitality, Visual Design, Industrial technology Multi Media and Computing. New facilities for Drama and Music have now been added including a drama space, drama room, music foyer and music classroom.
K-12 Resources Centre: contains the JC Cowell Library, the Careers Reference Area, AudioVisual Control Room and the Independent Learning Centre. Demolished as of early 2017, another is being rebuilt in place.
Wingara Senior Studies Centre: Study rooms, Geography and History classrooms, common room, Conference Room and kitchen for Year 12.
Roseby Ball House: "The Quad" - a three-storey building designed around a central courtyard. For administration, classroom teaching, science laboratories, mathematics laboratory, staff rooms. Currently has no electricity in certain areas due to an overloaded power grid, and when it will be expanded is uncertain.
The Langdon Wing: Junior School administration and classrooms, Japanese Room, Language laboratory, computer laboratory. Partially demolished for construction on the Junior School. Sections of it were demolished throughout 2019 and 2022 to make way for the next stage of the construction master plan.
The Aquatic Centre: consists of the Aquatic Centre plus a multi purpose court. The indoor Aquatic Centre contains a 25-metre water polo pool plus a beginners pool. Other sporting facilities include a mini gymnasium and multi purpose court.
The Performing Arts Centre: Also commonly known as the PAC, consists of a main stage with seating for 1,000+ people including a gallery level, large music and drama classrooms and storeroom, and 10 individual music practice rooms for individual student tutorials and class groups.

Notable alumnae
Dr. Kerry Chant - NSW Chief Health Officer
Nicole Harris - paralympian

See also

 List of Anglican schools in New South Wales
 List of non-government schools in New South Wales

References

External links
 

Educational institutions established in 1933
Anglican primary schools in Sydney
Anglican secondary schools in Sydney
Girls' schools in New South Wales
Association of Heads of Independent Girls' Schools
Junior School Heads Association of Australia Member Schools
1933 establishments in Australia
School buildings completed in 1933
Hurstville, New South Wales
Alliance of Girls' Schools Australasia